Topilin is a Russian masculine surname, its feminine counterpart is Topilina. It may refer to
Gelena Topilina (born 1994), Russian competitor in synchronized swimming
Maxim Topilin (born 1967), Russian economist and minister

Russian-language surnames